Laurentian Regional High School is an English secondary school in Lachute in the region of Laurentides, Québec, Canada. It contains classes for grades seven through eleven, and is run by the Sir Wilfrid Laurier School Board.

It serves Lachute, Boileau, Brownsburg-Chatham, Gore, Grenville, Grenville-sur-la-Rouge, Harrington, Lac-des-Seize-Îles, Mille-Isles, Morin-Heights, Namur, Notre-Dame-de-Bonsecours, Notre-Dame-de-la-Paix, Prévost, Saint-Andre-d'Argenteuil, Saint-Colomban, Saint-Hippolyte, Saint-Jérôme, Saint-Sauveur, Saint-Sauveur-des-Monts, Sainte-Adèle, Sainte-Anne-des-Lacs, Saint-Émile-de-Suffolk, Sainte-Marguerite-Estérel, Sainte-Sophie, Wentworth, Wentworth-Nord, almost all of Montcalm, northern sections of Mirabel, sections of Saint-Adolph-d'Howard, and a portion of Chénéville.

LRHS was built in 1967 and graduated its first class in 1968.  It graduates around 150 students a year and has an average of around 900-1100 students each school year. The school motto is Learning and Respect Harvest Success. Their Rugby Team is known as the Celts. The program has grown over the past 8 years to produce over 20 young players to represent Québec in the Canadian National Rugby Festival since 2009.

References

External links
 Laurentian Regional High School

English-language schools in Quebec
Educational institutions established in 1968
High schools in Quebec
Lachute
School buildings completed in 1967
1968 establishments in Quebec
Schools in Laurentides